Carabus pingpong is a species of black and brown ground beetle in the  Carabinae subfamily that is endemic to Gansu, province of China. They are greenish- They are brownish-black coloured.

References

pingpong
Insects of China
Endemic fauna of Gansu
Beetles described in 2004